Eileen Dennes (1 February 1898 – 22 January 1991) was an Irish-born actress of the silent era.

Early life 
Eileen Dennes, born Eileen Amhurst Cowen was an Irish silent film actress who was born in 1898 in Dublin, Ireland. She began on the stage in the early 1910s. She travelled to America in 1917. She found work at the Empire Al Star Film Co. and was offered the role of Ethel Fielding in her first film ‘The Unforeseen’. She made more than one film in Hollywood that year with Olive Tell. She then decided to find work in England, it was there that Cecile Hepworth offered her a contract and she made her first English film as Rhoda Meredith in ’Sheba’ starring Alma Taylor in 1919. After this Dennes was given the chance at starring roles in films such as ’Once Abroad the Lugger’ in 1920, ‘Mr. Justice Raffles’ in 1921 and ‘The Pipes of Pan’ in 1923 again with Alma Taylor. Dennes’ last film appearance was as Lucy in ‘The Squire of Long Hadley’ with Brian Ahearn for the Stoll Film Co. in 1925.

Career 
While Irish male actors made such a big impression on the silent-film industry in Hollywood, a couple of Irish women stand out. A Dublin actress, Dennes, born in 1898, had a much shorter career. Dennes arrived in Hollywood in 1917 and found work at the Empire All-Star Film Co and was offered the role as Ethel Fielding in her debut film 'The Unforeseen' with Olive Tell she made one more film in Hollywood that same year and decided to find film work in England, Cecil Hepworth offered her a contract and she made her first British film as Rhoda Meredith in 'Sheba' starring Alma Taylor and Gerald Ames in 1919 afterwards Hepworth gave her the chance in starring roles, such as in 'Once Aboard the Lugger' in 1920, 'Mr. Justice Raffles' in 1921 and 'The Pipes of Pan' again with Alma Taylor in 1923. The final film that she worked on with Cecil Hepworth was "Comin Thro The Rye", in 1923. After this film she never worked with Hepworth again and the next director that she worked with was Fred LeRoy Granville on his film "The Sins Ye Do", in 1924. Dennes last film appearance was as Lucy in 'The Squire of Long Hadley' with Brian Aherne for the Stoll Film Co in 1925. Between 1919 and 1925, she appeared in a dozen silent films, then her movie career petered out. In retrospect, it's amazing how many Irish actors contributed to the silent-movie era in Hollywood, which flourished for a mere 15 years.

Selected filmography
 The Unforeseen (1917) - Ethel Fielding
 Her Sister (1917) - Jane Alderson
 Sheba (1917) -  Bessie Saxton
 The Forest on the Hill (1919) - Audrey Leaman
 Alf's Button (1919) - Lady Isobel Fitzpeter
 Once Aboard the Lugger (1920) - Mary Humfray
 John Forrest Finds Himself (1920) - The Pet
 Mrs. Erricker's Reputation (1920) - Lady Lettice Erricker
 Great Snakes (1920) - Bella Parkinson
 The Tinted Venus (1920) - Bella Parkinson
 Wild Heather (1921) - Dolly
 Tansy (1921) - Vicar's Daughter
 Mr. Justice Raffles (1921) - Camilla Belsize
 Tit for Tat (1921) - Clove
 The Pipes of Pan (1921) - Enid Markham
 Strangling Threads (1923) - Miss Debb
 Comin' Thro the Rye (1923)- Sylvia Fleming
 The Sins Ye Do (1923)- Lady Eslin
 Peeps Into Puzzleland (Short) - 1924 - Mother
 A Dear Liar (Short) - 1924
 The Squire of Long Hadley (1925) - Lucy

References

External links

1898 births
1991 deaths
Year of death unknown
Irish silent film actresses
20th-century Irish actresses
Actresses from Dublin (city)
Irish expatriates in the United States